Brett Boyko (born August 4, 1992) is a professional Canadian football offensive lineman for the Orlando Guardians of the XFL. He most recently played for the Saskatchewan Roughriders of the Canadian Football League (CFL). He has also been a member of the Philadelphia Eagles and San Diego / Los Angeles Chargers of the National Football League (NFL), San Diego Fleet of the Alliance of American Football (AAF), and BC Lions of the CFL. He played college football at UNLV.

Professional career

CFL and NFL Drafts 
Prior to the 2015 NFL Draft Boyko gained interest from several NFL teams and he also participated in the NFL Scouting Combine in Indianapolis, in February 2015. Boyko was ranked as the number one overall prospect in the Canadian Football League Scouting Bureau's September rankings heading into the 2015 CFL Draft and later fell to 2nd place in the December rankings. The uncertainty of whether he would stay in the NFL led Boyko to get drafted 14th overall in the 2015 CFL draft by the BC Lions. Despite the interest, Boyko was not drafted by any team in the 2015 NFL Draft.

Philadelphia Eagles
Boyko was signed by the Philadelphia Eagles as an undrafted free agent on May 2, 2015. On September 4, 2015, Boyko was cut in the last round on preseason cuts. On September 6, 2015, Boyko was signed to the Philadelphia Eagles practice squad.  On May 17, 2016, Boyko was released by the Eagles.

San Diego / Los Angeles Chargers
On June 2, 2016, Boyko signed with the Chargers. On September 3, 2016, he was released by the Chargers. He was signed to the Chargers' practice squad on October 4, 2016. He signed a reserve/future contract with the Chargers on January 3, 2017. On September 2, 2017, Boyko was waived by the Chargers and was signed to the practice squad the next day. He was promoted to the active roster on December 19, 2017. He was waived by the Chargers on December 29, 2017. He signed a reserve/future contract with the Chargers on January 1, 2018. On September 1, 2018, Boyko was waived by the Chargers.

San Diego Fleet
On December 2, 2018, Boyko signed with the San Diego Fleet of the Alliance of American Football (AAF). The league subsequently folded partway through its inaugural season, leaving Boyko as a free agent.

BC Lions 
On May 15, 2019, Boyko signed with the BC Lions of the Canadian Football League (CFL). He played in 15 games and started in five in 2019. He did not play in 2020 due to the cancellation of the 2020 CFL season and was released on February 12, 2021.

Saskatchewan Roughriders
Boyko signed with the Saskatchewan Roughriders on March 1, 2021. He played in eight games in 2021 and became a free agent upon the expiry of his contract on February 8, 2022.

Orlando Guardians
On March 2, 2023, Boyko signed with the Orlando Guardians.

References

External links
 UNLV Rebels football bio
 Philadelphia Eagles bio

1992 births
Living people
Sportspeople from Saskatoon
Players of Canadian football from Saskatchewan
American football offensive guards
American football offensive tackles
Canadian players of American football
UNLV Rebels football players
Philadelphia Eagles players
San Diego Chargers players
Los Angeles Chargers players
San Diego Fleet players
BC Lions players
Saskatchewan Roughriders players
Orlando Guardians players